István Matetits (born 6 September 1993) is a Hungarian football player who plays for Kapuvár.

Club statistics

Updated to games played as of 2 June 2013.

References
MLSZ 
HLSZ 

1993 births
Living people
People from Kapuvár
Hungarian footballers
Association football forwards
Győri ETO FC players
FC Ajka players
Nemzeti Bajnokság I players
Nemzeti Bajnokság II players
Hungarian expatriate footballers
Expatriate footballers in Austria
Hungarian expatriate sportspeople in Austria
Sportspeople from Győr-Moson-Sopron County